German submarine U-27 was a Type VIIA U-boat of Nazi Germany's Kriegsmarine built for service in World War II. Her keel was laid down in November 1935 in Bremen. She was commissioned  in August 1936 with Korvettenkapitän Hans Ibbeken in command. Ibbeken was relieved on 4 October 1937, by Johannes Franz, who commanded the boat until 6 June 1939 when Hans-Georg von Friedeburg assumed command for barely one month. He was relieved on 8 July again by Johannes Franz, who commanded the boat until her loss on 20 September 1939.

U-27 had a very short career, with only one war patrol and only two enemy ships sunk. All 38 crewmen survived and were made prisoner for the remainder of the war.

Construction and design

Construction
U-27 was ordered by the Kriegsmarine on 1 April 1935 in violation of the Treaty of Versailles. Her keel was laid down in the AG Weser shipyard in Bremen as yard number 908 on 11 November 1935. After about nine months of construction, she was launched on 24 June 1936 and commissioned into the Kriegsmarine as the second Type VIIA submarine, (after , which was commissioned  a few months earlier), on 12 August under the command of Korvettenkapitän Hans Ibbeken.

Design

Like all Type VIIA submarines, U-27 displaced  on the surface and  submerged. The submarine was also equipped with two Brown, Boveri & Cie GG UB 720/8 electric motors that totaled . U-27s armament consisted of five  torpedo tubes (four located in the bow and one in the stern). She could have up to 11 torpedoes on board or 22 TMA mines or 33 TMB mines. U-27 was also equipped with an  L/45 deck gun with 220 rounds. Her anti-aircraft defenses consisted of one  anti-aircraft gun. U-27 had a crew of four officers and 40 to 56 enlisted men.

Service history
U-27 had a very short career, conducting only one war patrol and sinking only two enemy vessels before she herself was sunk. She left Wilhelmshaven on her first war patrol on 23 August 1939. For a period of 24 days, she traveled down the coast of Germany and neutral Belgium and the Netherlands, through the English Channel and out into the Atlantic Ocean off the coast of Ireland. Here, the boat sank two British trawlers, totaling 624 GRT. Following the sinking of Davara, her captain and 11 other crew members were picked up by the steam merchant ship Willowpool. The second vessel to be sunk was the trawler Rudyard Kipling. Following the sinking of Rudyard Kipling, the submarine picked up the crew of the trawler who were then given food and warm clothes. Eight hours later, Rudyard Kiplings crew were allowed to re-enter their lifeboats to row the remaining  to Ireland.

Fate
On 20 September 1939, three torpedoes were fired at the warships, but failed to do any damage when they exploded prematurely. The British vessels replied with a series of depth charge attacks, one of which damaged the German submarine sufficiently to force it to the surface. Fortunes ramming attack was curtailed when it became apparent that the U-Boat was surrendering. All 38 crewmen survived and were taken prisoner. U-27 became the second German submarine to be sunk in World War II after  was sunk on 14 September 1939.

U-27s skipper, Kapitänleutnant Johannes Franz was able, via code, to inform Bdu, the U-boat high command, of the situation regarding the malfunctioning torpedoes from his prison camp.

Summary of raiding history

See also
Battle of the Atlantic (1939-1945)

References

Bibliography

External links

German Type VIIA submarines
U-boats commissioned in 1936
U-boats sunk in 1939
U-boats sunk by depth charges
World War II submarines of Germany
World War II shipwrecks in the Atlantic Ocean
1936 ships
Ships built in Bremen (state)
U-boats sunk by British warships
Military units and formations of Nazi Germany in the Spanish Civil War
Maritime incidents in September 1939